Leslie Scott may refer to:

 Leslie Scott (game designer) (born 1955), creator of the game Jenga
 Sir Leslie Scott (British politician) (1869–1950), Conservative MP 1910–1929, Solicitor-General 1922
 Leslie M. Scott (1878–1968), Oregon historian and politician
 Les Scott (born 1947), Australian politician
 Leslie Scott, clarinettist with the Steve Reich Ensemble
 Leslie Scott (footballer) (1895–1973), former A.F.C. Sunderland goalkeeper

See also
 Lesley Scott, screenwriter